Comicpalooza is a large annual, multi-genre, comic book, science fiction, anime, gaming, and pop culture convention in the Southern United States and is held in Houston, Texas.  The event is organized by John Simons, the originator of the event along with Startling Events, LLC.  The event hosts the annual Comicpalooza Fandom Awards. It is the fourth largest Houston-based organized event behind Houston Rodeo, Houston Pride, and Astroworld Festival.

History

2008
The first Comicpalooza was held July 19, 2008.  The event took place in the lobby of the Alamo Drafthouse Cinema located in Houston, and corresponded with the release of the film The Dark Knight.  The event included a handful of tables with local comic book artists.

2009
In 2009, Comicpalooza expanded to a two-day event which took place at West Oaks Mall.  Question and answer sessions and a charity live art auction were added to the event.  Guests included: David Mack, Terry Moore, Steve Scott, Tom Hodges, Mat Johnson, Andy Kuhn, and Dirk Strangely.

2010
In 2010, Comicpalooza expanded to a three-day event, taking place at the George R. Brown Convention Center attracting over 3,000 attendees the previous year.  The event no longer focused exclusively on comics, but expanded to include science fiction, fantasy, horror, steam punk and other genres. During this year, the convention was held on the 2nd floor of the George R. Brown, in the smallest middle section of the convention center. In addition to Q&A sessions and the live art auction, Comicpalooza hosted celebrity guests, a three-day film festival, costume contest, live DJ room, cockpit simulators from MechCorps Entertainment LLC of the BattleTech Centers, and a $5,000 Magic: The Gathering tournament in addition to opening gaming and numerous panels by fan groups.  The event also included a performance by the Intergalactic Nemesis Live-Action Graphic Novel and touring music act Dead P.A.  Guests included: Bruce Campbell, Ray Park, Nicholas Brendon, Peter Mayhew, Jason Dohring, Francis Capra, Dichen Lachman, Phil Foglio, David Malki, R. K. Milholland, Brian Denham, Larry Elmore, Rob Liefeld, David Mack, Jim Mahfood, Humberto Ramos, Dirk Strangely, Ben Templesmith, Ethan Van Sciver, Bernie Wrightson, and others.

2011
Comicpalooza 2011 was held May 27–29, and featured a Zombie theme and an Anime component for the first time. With the previous years turnout, the convention expanded to two bigger halls on the 3rd floor. That year presented new features, including Houston Roller Derby, Local Wrestling, the International Quidditch Association, and local fan groups of the presented genres.  Guests included Edward James Olmos, Meaghan Rath, Sam Trammell, Jeff Hughes, Arthur Suydm, Alejandro Garza, Jon Hughes, and much more. Fan groups included the Houston Area Ghost Busters, the Star Garrison of the 501st Legion, and the Texas Lego users group, which displayed a variety of unique variety of never before seen Lego items. Attendance was roughly 10,000.

2012
Comicpalooza 2012 was held on May 25–27, 2012. Guests included Kristin Bauer, Michael Biehn, Jennifer Blanc, Julie Caitlin Brown, Larry Wade Carrell, Claudia Christian, David Della Rocco, Sean Patrick Flanery, Nick Gillard, Britt Griffith, Richard Hatch, Dylan Horne, Ernie Hudson.

2013
Comicpalooza 2013 was held on May 24–26, 2013. It was the year it made media history that was featured in numerous publications all over the world for the Guest panel featuring Sir Patrick Stewart and his emotional response to a question by a fan regarding domestic violence. Other guests included Michael Golden, Scott Steiner, Danny Trejo, Tom Kane, Benjamin Percy, Rachel Caine, Joseph Gatt, Michelle Rodriguez, Armin Shimerman, Rene Auberionois, Avery Brooks, Kris Holden-Ried, Zoie Palmer, Sam Huntington, Tabith St. Germain, Andrea Libman, Craig Parker, Richard Horvitz, Bernie Wrightson, Abney Park, Alan Dean Foster, George Perez, Jacqueline Carey, Chris Claremont, Julie Bell, Boris Vallejo.

2014
Comicpalooza 2014 was held on May 23–26, 2014. Guests included Jason Mewes, Stan Lee, Jim Cummings, Rose McGowan, Peter Davison, "Agents of Shield" cast: Clark Gregg, Elizabeth Henstridge, Brett Dalton, Ming-Na Wen, as well as Jim Steranko, Austin St. John, Davis Yost, Bret Hart, Kevin Nash, Johnny Yong Bosch, John Barrowman, Paul McGann, Sylvester McCoy, Colin Baker, Lou Ferrigno, Tricia Helfer, John Scalzi, Kevin J. Anderson, and Ksenia Solo.

2015
Comicpalooza 2015 was held on May 22–25, 2015. Guests included Rosario Dawson, Chloe Bennet, NASA astronaut Stan Love, as well as Summer Glau, GWAR, David Ellefson, Marky Ramone, Jason Isaacs, Sting (Wrestler), Ramond E. Feist, Henry Winkler, as well as the cast of "Gotham": Cory Michael Smith, Cameron Monaghan, Sean Pertwee, Camren Bicondova, Donal Logue. Also featured were Mercedes Lackey, Larry Dixon, Walt Simonson, Louise Simonson, Rachel Caine, Linda Blair, George Takei, Stan Lee, Tuatha Dea, Laurie Holden, Jeff Smith, Jonathan Maberry, "Rowdy" Roddy Piper, Kevin Eastman, Peter David, Simon Bisley, Katie Cook, and Basil Gogos.

2016 
In 2016, Comicpalooza hit another milestone. As one of Houston's leading destinations, Comicpalooza bridged a deeper partnership with the Greater Houston Convention & Visitors Bureau. Comicpalooza 2016 was held on June 17–19, 2016. Guests included Kate Beckinsale, Lou Ferrigno, The Boondocks Saints' stars Norman Reedus, Sean Patrick Flannery, David Della Rocco, Clifton Collins Jr., and Brian Mahoney. Others included Ric Flair, Eliza Dushku, Kel Mitchell, Dead 7's Chris Kirkpatrick, A.J. McLean, Jeff Timmons, Eric-Michael Estrada. Also featured were Charlie Hunnam, Lennie James, Dominic Cooper, Fear Factory's Burton C. Bell and Dino Cazares, Star Wars alumni Peter Mayhew and David Prowse, Walter Koenig, as well as the cast of Aliens reunion: Sigourney Weaver, Bill Paxton, Paul Reiser, Michael Biehn, Carrie Henn and Mark Rolston.

2020 
The 13th annual event was cancelled and deferred to 2021 as the COVID-19 pandemic was to blame.

Comicpalooza with anime, manga, video games, cosplay and Japanese culture
Comicpalooza has featured Anime for the first time in the convention and was held May 27–29, 2011 at George R. Brown Convention Center in Houston. Guests included: Leraldo Anzaldua, Maggie Flecknoe, Tiffany Grant, Josh Grelle, Taylor Hannah, Samantha Inoue-Harte, Brittney Karbowski, Mark Laskowski, Monica Rial, Claire Hamilton, Richard Steven Horvitz, and Veronica Taylor.
In 2016, Comicpalooza has featured Japanese street fashion for the first time to increase more attendees who are interested in J-Fashion.

Event history

References

External links
 Comicpalooza Official Website
 Comicpalooza Official Blog
 Article from Comic Book Resources

Comics conventions in the United States
Multigenre conventions
Gaming conventions
Nerd culture
Conventions in Houston
2008 establishments in Texas